Willow Creek Intercity is a one route transit system in the United States that provides three weekday-only commute trips between Willow Creek and Arcata, California. The service is operated by the Redwood Transit System and is overseen by Humboldt Transit Authority. The service provides a connection to Trinity Transit and KTNET in Willow Creek.

References

Bus transportation in California
Public transportation in Humboldt County, California